Oleksandr Devlysh (born 2 November 1986) is a Ukrainian Paralympic footballer who won a gold medal at the 2008 Summer Paralympics in Beijing, China. During the Paralympics his team beat Brazil 6-0 and then, during the final, beat Russia 2–0. In 2013 he participated at the 2013 Cerebral Palsy Games for which he won top scorer award and where his team won 1–0 against Brazil.

References

External links
 

1986 births
Living people
Paralympic 7-a-side football players of Ukraine
Paralympic gold medalists for Ukraine
Paralympic silver medalists for Ukraine
Paralympic medalists in football 7-a-side
7-a-side footballers at the 2008 Summer Paralympics
7-a-side footballers at the 2012 Summer Paralympics
Medalists at the 2008 Summer Paralympics
Medalists at the 2012 Summer Paralympics